magniX is an electric motor manufacturer for electric aircraft, wholly owned by Singapore investor Clermont Group.
The company is headquartered in Everett, Washington, United States.

History

The company was founded in 2009 in Australia to research various technologies for electric motors. In 2017, it developed a motor that became their prototype and led to pivoting the company to focus on Electric Aviation and move its headquarters to Redmond, Washington.
The magni5, its original prototype electric motor, was developed in 2017.

In June 2018, magniX publicly stated plans to fly an electric Cessna 208 Caravan with a  motor for up to an hour, by August 2019.
By then, the company's magni5 electric motor could produce  peak at 2,500 rpm at 95% efficiency with a 53 kg (117 lb) dry mass motor, having a 5 kW/kg power density.

By September 2018, a  electric motor with a propeller had been tested on a Cessna iron bird.
The motor ran on a test dynamometer for 1,000 hours. The iron bird is a Caravan forward fuselage used as a test bed, with the usual PT6 turboprop engine replaced by an electric motor, inverter and a liquid-cooling system, including radiators, driving a Cessna 206 propeller.
The production motor will produce  at 1,900 rpm, down from the test motor's 2,500 rpm, allowing the installation of the propeller without a reduction gearbox.

By April 2019, the magni250 375 hp (280 kW) was offered for the Eviation Alice as a second power option after Siemens 260 kW motors, as magniX had accumulated over 1,500 hours of ground tests in Redmond and Australia.

Beaver conversion 
By then, magniX partnered with Harbour Air to electrify its entire fleet: the first converted aircraft was to be a DHC-2 Beaver serving as the test prototype for the magniX motor, energy storage, and control systems. 
On December 10, 2019, the eBeaver flew for the first time.
Low energy density but proven lithium-ion batteries filled the cabin and took the prototype to its maximum gross weight to provide enough energy for a 15 min flight with a 25 min reserve.

Caravan conversion 
The first flight of the modified Cessna 208B Grand Caravan was completed at Grant County International Airport on May 28, 2020.
Its 30 min first flight consumed $6 worth of electricity, needing 30-40 min of charging.
The magni500-powered variant can fly  with 4-5 passengers while keeping reserve power, and aims for a certification by the end of 2021, hoping to operate 100-mile flights with a full load of nine passengers with better batteries.

In December 2020, CEO Roei Ganzarski told an interviewer that the company was consolidating its operations at Everett, Washington, and had shut their Australian site on the Gold Coast earlier in the year. In January 2021 the company formally announced that they will be moving their headquarters from Redmond to Everett, with plans to relocate all of their Australia operations there as well.

Products
 magni350EPU:  Take-Off/continuous, 111.5 kg / 245.8 lbs, needs 2× magniDrive100
 magni650EPU:  Take-Off/continuous, 200 kg / 440.9 lbs, needs 4× magniDrive100
 magniDrive100:  power electronics used to run the magni350 and magni650, 12 kg / 26 lbs.

Customers and partners

See also

References

External links
 

Aircraft electric engines